Oraibi is an impact crater in the Oxia Palus quadrangle of Mars.  It was named by the IAU in 1976 after Oraibi, a town of the Hopi in Arizona, United States.

Oraibi lies within the Ares Vallis.  The landing site of the Mars Pathfinder lander and Sojourner rover is due north of Oraibi, where Ares Vallis meets Tiu Valles.

References 

Impact craters on Mars
Oxia Palus quadrangle